Answer to No One: The Colt Ford Classics is the first compilation album of country rap American musician Colt Ford. It was released on October 23, 2015. Features four songs from his first album Ride Through the Country, three songs from his latest album Thanks for Listening, three from Declaration of Independence and two from Every Chance I Get, as well as the title-track of Chicken & Biscuits and the song "Huntin' the World", featured in the album Mud Digger, of the eponymous artist.

Track listing

Chart performance

References 

2015 compilation albums
Colt Ford albums
Average Joes Entertainment albums